The Quaratesi Polyptych is a painting by the Italian late medieval painter Gentile da Fabriano, now divided between several museums.

It was painted by the artist for the Quaratesi family's chapel in the Church of San Niccolò Oltrarno, perhaps not a long time after the Strozzi Altarpiece. Today four of the five  original compartments (including the painted cusp) are known, as well as some parts of the predella (which has scenes of the Life of St. Nicholas):

Madonna with Child and Angels with, in the cusp, Angels and a medallion of the Redeemer  (central compartment), 139.9 x 83 cm, The Royal Collection, Hampton Court, stored at the National Gallery, London
St. Mary Magdalene, with cusp  (left compartment), 200 x 60 cm, Uffizi, Florence
St. Nicholas of Bari, with cusp (left compartment), 200 x 60 cm, Uffizi, Florence
St. John the Baptist, with cusp (right  compartment), 200 x 60 cm, Uffizi, Florence
St. George, with cusp (right compartment), 200 x 60 cm, Uffizi, Florence
Predella
Birth of St. Nicholas, 36.5 x 36.5 cm, Pinacoteca Vaticana, Rome
The Gift of St. Nicholas, 36.5 x 36.5 cm, Pinacoteca Vaticana, Rome
St. Nicholas Saving a Ship from the Tempest, 36.5 x 36.5 cm, Pinacoteca Vaticana, Rome
St. Nicholas Saves Three Youths from the Brine, 36.5 x 36.5 cm, Pinacoteca Vaticana, Rome
Miracle of the Pilgrims at St. Nicholas' Tomb, 36.5 x 36.5 cm,  National Gallery of Art, Washington, D.C.

Reconstruction

Sources

External links

1425 paintings
Paintings in the collection of the Uffizi
Paintings by Gentile da Fabriano
Paintings of the Madonna and Child
Paintings in the collection of the Vatican Museums
Polyptychs
Altarpieces
 Paintings on gold backgrounds